The Mary Dummage Shop is a historic Craftsman Fairy tale commercial building in downtown Carmel-by-the-Sea, California. It was built in 1926, by builder  Earl Percy Parkes. The shop was designated as a significant commercial building in the city's Downtown Historic District Property Survey, and was recorded with the Department of Parks and Recreation on September 13, 2002. The building is now occupied by the Galante Vineyards Tasting Room.

History

In 1926, Earl Percy Parkes built and designed a Craftsman Fairy tale building for Mary L. Dummage, based on Hugh W. Comstock's Tuck Box design, for $1,450. It is on Dolores Street between Ocean Avenue and 7th Avenue. The building is called the Mary Dummage Shop, and a common name for it was the "White Rabbit," that sold clothing, handknit sweaters, gifts, and home accessories.

The Mary Dummage Shop is a L-shaped one-story, wood-frame building with a steep front and side gabled roof. A Carmel stone partition extends to the eaves of the adjoining building. The building has two fixed glass windows with and a pyramid window above it, and a large multi pane display window. Stucco covers the walls below the roof line. A French style door faces Piccadilly Park to the south. A low Carmel stone wall to the south surrounds a garden area. The ground floor contains the Galante Vineyards Tasting Room retail shop. The Piccadilly Park was established in 1998 on Dolores Street NW of 7th Avenue after the city purchased the Piccadilly Nursery in the early 1980s. Landscaper Walter Guthrie designed the park. There are public restrooms at the rear of the park.

Mary Louise (Pearce) Dummage (1870-1952) was one Carmel's' first residents, settling in Pacific Grove, California in 1889, and buying a Carmel lot in 1903, from James Franklin Devendorf and Frank Hubbard Powers for $300. She was the daughter of William Wriley Pearce and Emily Elvira Stepp. She married William T. Dummage on November 16, 1913, in Carmel. He was sent to Carmel in 1892, to sell lots for Abbie Jane Hunter who worked for real estate developer Santiago J. Duckworth.

Dummage was a pioneering landowner and businesswoman, who opened Carmel's first restaurant, on a 20' x 30' tent on top of a wood platform in 1903. She acquired lots on the west side of Dolores and was involved in the early development of Carmel. Her sister-in-law, Laura May (Pearce) Wilson, and her husband purchased several parcels along Ocean Avenue and Dolores Street in 1903. The Philip Wilson Building, is a two-story Craftsman style building, that was built in 1905 on the corner of Ocean Avenue and Dolores Street as a real estate office, and in 1916 it became the first official City Hall.

In 1945, Dummage did a complete store remodel at the north-east corner of the building, with a stucco exterior, interior plaster, rewire, replaced the composition shingle roof, and added a Carmel stone partition for $3,000 by contractor Michael J. Murphy.

The Mary Dummage Shop qualifies for inclusion in the Downtown Historic District Property Survey because it is an example of the Craftsman Fairy-tale style of architecture popularized in Carmel in the 1920s by master builder Hugh W. Comstock. The building was designed by Earl Percy Parkes in June 1926 at the same time as the Tuck Box, by Comstock, was under construction across the street. These buildings are internationally associated with the city of Carme-by-the-Sea.

First Dummage Shop

Prior to building the Mary Dummage Shop, Dummage hired Parkes to design and build a two-story Pueblo Revival style building in 1924, called the Mary Dummage Shops or the "Corner Cupboard Gift Shop" for $2,500. It is located on the corner of Ocean Avenue and Dolores Street.

The building was designated as a significant commercial building in the city's Downtown Historic District Property Survey, and was registered with the California Register of Historical Resources on November 30, 2002. It qualifies under California Register Criterion 3 as significant for being designed and constructed by Earl Percy Parkes in 1924. Today it is the home of the Classic Art Gallery.

Earl Percy Parkes 
Percy Parkes was born on May 2, 1884, in Port Clinton, Ohio. He is the son of William H. and Louise Barnes. He worked with the passenger department of the Rock Island Railroad Company. In his traveling for the company he came to California. He entered the University of Los Angeles to study law. He married Charlotte Maud Janoushek on December 9, 1910, in Los Angeles and had one child. Parkes became involved in real estate in Los Angeles, and in 1911, started his career as a building contractor. He worked as a builder for eight years before he moved his business to Carmel in 1919. 

In 1924, he and other Carmel residents owned shares in the formation of the Building and Loan Society, located in the Carmel Realty Company offices. He was a member of the Monterey County Builders' Association and advertised his company "Percy Parkes" as Contractor, Designer, and Builder, located in the Parkes Building on Dolores Street and Ocean Avenue. He was described by Rolin G. Watkins, as "among the progressive building contractors who in recent years have done so much toward the advancement of the material interests of Monterey county."

Parkes designed and constructed the following buildings:

Parkes died on October 23, 1955, in Carmel-by-the-Sea, California, at the age of 71. He is buried at the El Carmelo Cemetery in Pacific Grove, California.

In 1957, Dummage's son, Robert A. Norton sold the old Pacfic Telephone and Telegraph Company Building for $100,000 to Barnet Segal for the Carmel Savings and Loan Association. The Tel and Tels Building had originally been built by Percy Parkes for Norton's mother, Mary Louise Dummage, at a cost of $8,000.

See also
Carmel-by-the-Sea, California

References

External links

 Downtown Conservation District Historic Property Survey
 Piccadilly Park

1926 establishments in California
Carmel-by-the-Sea, California
Buildings and structures in Monterey County, California